The Women's 3000 metres steeplechase event at the 2011 European Athletics U23 Championships was held in Ostrava, Czech Republic, at Městský stadion on 14 and 16 July.

Medalists

Results

Final
16 July 2011 / 20:00

Intermediate times:
1000m: 3:15.38 Giulia Martinelli 
2000m: 6:36.30 Giulia Martinelli

Heats
Qualified: First 4 in each heat (Q) and 4 best performers (q) advance to the Final

Summary

Details

Heat 1
14 July 2011 / 10:50

Intermediate times:
1000m: 3:16.60 Karoline Bjerkeli Grøvdal 
2000m: 6:36.51 Karoline Bjerkeli Grøvdal

Heat 2
14 July 2011 / 11:06

Intermediate times:
1000m: 3:22.80 Eilish McColgan 
2000m: 6:46.63 Martina Tresch

Participation
According to an unofficial count, 22 athletes from 14 countries participated in the event.

References

3000 metres steeplechasechase
Steeplechase at the European Athletics U23 Championships
2011 in women's athletics